The National Progress Party of Armenia is a political party in Armenia, founded on 3 October 2018, by a group of political activists following the 2018 Armenian Velvet Revolution.

History 
Founders of the party included several activists from different civic and environmental movements, including the 2015 Electric Yerevan protests, among others. Most of these activists were also members of  the movement called "We are this country," who marched to the president's palace in April 2016, under the slogan "We are with our soldiers."

The party officially launched its platform during its founding convention held on 3 October 2018, in Yerevan.

The party was the only political party running in the 2018 elections which was headed by a woman, Lusine Haroyan. Roughly 40% of party members are women.

In April 2019, Lusine Haroyan announced she was stepping down as leader of the party.

On 5 April 2021, the Board of the National Progress Party announced its decision to join the National Democratic Pole political alliance, following the on-going political unrest in the country.

Ideology 
The party announced social liberalism as its principal ideology, however party members confirmed that the party is not explicitly socialist.

The party also advocates for the welfare state, increasing immigration, rural development, strengthening the middle-class and endorses a regulated market economy and the expansion of civil and political rights, including direct democracy and freedom of press.

In terms of foreign policy, the party supports the unification of Armenia and the Republic of Artsakh, developing stronger ties with Georgia, the European Union, United States, Iran, India, Japan and China while maintaining positive relations with Russia. However, the party believes that Armenia should withdraw its membership from the Eurasian Union and focus on both the Western integration and European integration of Armenia.

Electoral record 
On 9 December 2018, the National Progress Party participated in the 2018 Armenian parliamentary election. The party had 94 candidates across the country.

During the 2018 election campaign, the National Progress Party criticized Prime Minister-turned-revolutionary leader Nikol Pashinyan for abandoning the revolutionary agenda, including failure to reform the Constitution, the Electoral Code, the Law on Political Parties and failure towards instituting transitional justice before holding the snap elections. The National Progress Party advocated for abolishing the immunity of parliament members, Constitutional reforms and regional reforms and for greater human rights of citizens.

Following the 2018 election, the party won 4121 votes, or 0.33% of the popular vote. As this was less than the 5% minimum required, the party failed to gain any seats in the National Assembly. After the election results were announced, party members emphasized that they, as an extra-parliamentary force, will continue their activities and follow developments.

The party confirmed it would participate in the 2021 Armenian parliamentary elections as part of the National Democratic Pole alliance. Following the election, the National Democratic Pole received 1.49% of the popular vote, failing to gain any seats in the National Assembly.

Parliamentary elections

New constitutional movement 
In 2019, the National Progress Party initiated the New Constitution movement by publishing its proposed Constitutional Amendments on its website and asked citizens to engage in the drafting and discussion process. This new form of "crowd-sourced" constitution development is similar to an initiative proposed in Iceland.

See also 

Politics of Armenia
Programs of political parties in Armenia

References

External links 
 National Progress Party on Facebook

2018 establishments in Armenia
Political parties in Armenia
Left-wing parties
Political parties established in 2018
Pro-European political parties in Armenia
Social liberal parties
Liberal parties in Armenia